Pompeo Aldrovandini (1677–1735) was an Italian painter of the Baroque period. Born in Bologna to a family of painters, he mainly learned from his cousin Tommaso Aldrovandini and was employed much in the decoration of churches, palaces, and theatres of Dresden, Prague, and Vienna. He died at Rome.

References

1677 births
1735 deaths
17th-century Italian painters
Italian male painters
18th-century Italian painters
Painters from Bologna
Italian Baroque painters
18th-century Italian male artists